Catuaba sanguinoloenta is a species of beetle in the family Cerambycidae, and the only species in the genus Catuaba. It was described by  Martins and Galileo in 2003.

References

Apomecynini
Beetles described in 2003